Yeshe Dorje (1676–1702) was the eleventh Gyalwa Karmapa, head of the Kagyu School of Tibetan Buddhism.

Yeshe Dorje was born in Mayshö, Kham. He was discovered by Minjur Dorje and recognized by Shamar Yeshe Nyinpo, the seventh Shamarpa. Yeshe Dorje was transferred to Central Tibet for his education and was ordained in the Tsurphu Monastery. He received an education both in the Kagyu school as well as the Nyingma school. Yeshe Dorje integrated the teaching of Tercho by Padmasambhava in the Kagyu school.

He was the shortest-lived of all the Karmapas. Like the 10th Karmapa before him, he left a detailed letter referring to his next incarnation.

Footnotes

Further reading

External links
 HH11 Karmapa - Yeshe Dorje

1676 births
1702 deaths
11
17th-century Tibetan people
18th-century Tibetan people